Baraguá is a municipality and town in the Ciego de Ávila Province of Cuba. Its administrative seat is located in the town of Gaspar.

Geography
The municipality occupies the south-eastern part of the province, and the area is dominated by mangrove.

Demographics
In 2004, the municipality of Baraguá had a population of 32,408.

See also
Municipalities of Cuba
List of cities in Cuba
Baraguá Municipal Museum

References

External links

Populated places in Ciego de Ávila Province